The 2011–12 Boston Celtics season was the 66th season of the franchise in the National Basketball Association (NBA). The Boston Celtics finished the regular season with a 39–27 won-loss record, which was the 4th best in the East, winning their 21st Atlantic Division title. Their longest winning and losing streaks were 5 games. The leading scorer was Paul Pierce, averaging 19.4 PPG. The leading rebounder was Kevin Garnett (8.2 RPG). Rajon Rondo led the team and the league in assists per-game with 11.7. The regular season was reduced from its usual 82 games to 66 due to the lockout. The Celtics made a relatively deep playoff run, where they defeated the Atlanta Hawks in six games in the First Round, and the Philadelphia 76ers in seven games in the Semifinals, eventually challenging the Miami Heat for the third consecutive season (the team who defeated them in last season's Semifinals), in the Eastern Conference Finals. They ultimately lost the series in seven games to the eventual NBA champion.

Following the season, Ray Allen departed via free agency for the eventual champion Miami Heat, effectively ending the Big 3 era in Boston. During his 2 years as a Heat, Allen would help them win a second-straight title the following year over the San Antonio Spurs in seven games, and appear again in the 2014 Finals against the same Spurs team.

It was also the NBA's first time without Shaquille O'Neal since 1991–92, as he retired in May 2011 and played his final season as a Celtic.

Key dates
 June 23: The 2011 NBA draft took place at Prudential Center in Newark, New Jersey.
 December 25: The regular season begins with a matchup against the New York Knicks in a rematch from the previous season's playoffs.
 April 18: The Celtics secure the Atlantic Division title in a 102–98 win against the Orlando Magic.
 April 29: The 2012 NBA Playoffs started.
 May 10: The Celtics advanced to the Eastern Conference Semi-Finals, defeating the Atlanta Hawks.
 May 25: The Celtics advanced to the Eastern Conference Finals, defeating the Philadelphia 76ers
 June 9: The Celtics were defeated by the Miami Heat and were eliminated from the NBA Playoffs.

Draft picks

Roster

Roster notes
Forward Jeff Green missed the entire season due to recovery from a heart surgery.

Pre-season

Game log

|- style="background:#cfc;"
| 1
| December 18
| @ Toronto
| 
| Ray Allen (12)
| Kevin Garnett (7)
| Rajon Rondo (8)
| Air Canada Centre16,721
| 1–0
|- style="background:#cfc;"
| 2
| December 21
| Toronto
| 
| Rajon Rondo (12)
| Ray Allen (6)
| Rajon Rondo (6)
| TD Garden18.624
| 2–0
|-

Regular season

Standings

Record vs. opponents

Game log

|- style="background:#fcc;"
| 1
| December 25
| @ New York
| 
| Rajon Rondo (31)
| Brandon Bass (11)
| Rajon Rondo (13)
| Madison Square Garden19,763
| 0–1
|- style="background:#fcc;"
| 2
| December 27
| @ Miami
| 
| Ray Allen (28)
| Rajon Rondo (8)
| Rajon Rondo (12)
| American Airlines Arena20,166
| 0–2
|- style="background:#fcc;"
| 3
| December 28
| @ New Orleans
| 
| Ray Allen (15)
| Kevin Garnett (7)
| Rajon Rondo (12)
| New Orleans Arena17,802
| 0–3
|- style="background:#cfc;"
| 4
| December 30
| Detroit
| 
| Jermaine O'Neal (17)
| Jermaine O'Neal (7)
| Paul Pierce (5)
| TD Garden18,624
| 1–3

|- style="background:#cfc;"
| 5
| January 1
| @ Washington
| 
| Kevin Garnett (24)
| Rajon Rondo (11)
| Rajon Rondo (14)
| Verizon Center17,458
| 2–3
|- style="background:#cfc;"
| 6
| January 2
| Washington
| 
| Ray Allen (27)
| Paul Pierce (8)
| Rajon Rondo (13)
| TD Garden18,624
| 3–3
|- style="background:#cfc;"
| 7
| January 4
| New Jersey
| 
| Paul Pierce (24)
| Kevin Garnett (12)
| Rajon Rondo (12)
| TD Garden18,624
| 4–3
|- style="background:#fcc;"
| 8
| January 6
| Indiana
| 
| Ray Allen (23)
| Paul Pierce,Jermaine O'Neal (7)
| Rajon Rondo (9)
| TD Garden18,624
| 4–4
|- style="background:#fcc;"
| 9
| January 11
| Dallas
| 
| Rajon Rondo (24)
| Kevin Garnett (10)
| Rajon Rondo (7)
| TD Garden18,624
| 4–5
|- style="background:#fcc;"
| 10
| January 13
| Chicago
| 
| Ray Allen (16)
| Brandon Bass (9)
| Rajon Rondo (11)
| TD Garden18,624
| 4–6
|- style="background:#fcc;"
| 11
| January 14
| @ Indiana
| 
| Paul Pierce (21)
| Jermaine O'Neal (12)
| Rajon Rondo (9)
| Bankers Life Fieldhouse14,203
| 4–7
|- style="background:#fcc;"
| 12
| January 16
| Oklahoma City
| 
| Paul Pierce (24)
| Kevin Garnett (12)
| Rajon Rondo (9)
| TD Garden18,624
| 4–8
|- style="background:#cfc;"
| 13
| January 18
| Toronto
| 
| Rajon Rondo (21)
| Brandon Bass (9)
| Paul Pierce (7)
| TD Garden18,624
| 5–8
|- style="background:#fcc;"
| 14
| January 20
| Phoenix
| 
| Ray Allen (14)
| Ray Allen,Brandon Bass (6)
| Paul Pierce (6)
| TD Garden18,624
| 5–9
|- style="background:#cfc;"
| 15
| January 22
| @ Washington
| 
| Paul Pierce (34)
| Brandon Bass (9)
| Paul Pierce (10)
| Verizon Center15,818
| 6–9
|- style="background:#cfc;"
| 16
| January 23
| Orlando
| 
| Paul Pierce,  Brandon Bass (19)
| Kevin Garnett (10)
| Paul Pierce (7)
| TD Garden18,624
| 7–9
|- style="background:#cfc;"
| 17
| January 26
| @ Orlando
| 
| Paul Pierce (24)
| Kevin Garnett (10)
| Paul Pierce (10)
| Amway Center18,952
| 8–9
|- style="background:#cfc;"
| 18
| January 27
| Indiana
| 
| Paul Pierce (28)
| Paul Pierce (10)
| Paul Pierce (8)
| TD Garden18,624
| 9–9
|- style="background:#fcc;"
| 19
| January 29
| Cleveland
| 
| Ray Allen (22)
| Kevin Garnett (7)
| Paul Pierce (5)
| TD Garden18,624
| 9–10
|- style="background:#cfc;"
| 20
| January 31
| @ Cleveland
| 
| Paul Pierce (20)
| Brandon Bass (6)
| Ray Allen (8)
| Quicken Loans Arena14,798
| 10–10

|- style="background:#cfc;"
| 21
| February 1
| Toronto
| 
| Paul Pierce (17)
| Brandon Bass (9)
| Paul Pierce (8)
| TD Garden18,624
| 11–10
|- style="background:#cfc;"
| 22
| February 3
| New York
| 
| Paul Pierce (30)
| Kevin Garnett (8)
| Rajon Rondo (7)
| TD Garden18,624
| 12–10
|- style="background:#cfc;"
| 23
| February 5
| Memphis
| 
| Kevin Garnett (24)
| Kevin Garnett (9)
| Rajon Rondo (14)
| TD Garden18,624
| 13–10
|- style="background:#cfc;"
| 24
| February 7
| Charlotte
| 
| Kevin Garnett (22)
| Paul Pierce,Jermaine O'Neal (8)
| Rajon Rondo (14)
| TD Garden18,624
| 14–10
|- style="background:#fcc;"
| 25
| February 9
| L. A. Lakers
| 
| Ray Allen (22)
| Kevin Garnett (12)
| Paul Pierce,Rajon Rondo (7)
| TD Garden18,624
| 14–11
|- style="background:#fcc;"
| 26
| February 10
| @ Toronto
| 
| Kevin Garnett (17)
| Kevin Garnett (8)
| Rajon Rondo (7)
| Air Canada Centre19,207
| 14–12
|- style="background:#cfc;"
| 27
| February 12
| Chicago
| 
| Rajon Rondo (32)
| Kevin Garnett (12)
| Rajon Rondo (15)
| TD Garden18,624
| 15–12
|- style="background:#fcc;"
| 28
| February 15
| Detroit
| 
| Rajon Rondo (35)
| Chris Wilcox (9)
| Rajon Rondo (6)
| TD Garden18,624
| 15–13
|- style="background:#fcc;"
| 29
| February 16
| @ Chicago
| 
| Kevin Garnett (18)
| Kevin Garnett (10)
| Rajon Rondo (8)
| United Center22,592
| 15–14
|- style="background:#fcc;"
| 30
| February 19
| @ Detroit
| 
| Paul Pierce (18)
| Jermaine O'Neal (11)
| Rajon Rondo (10)
| The Palace of Auburn Hills22,076
| 15–15
|- style="background:#fcc;"
| 31
| February 20
| @ Dallas
| 
| Paul Pierce (20)
| Mickaël Piétrus (12)
| Mickaël Piétrus (4)
| American Airlines Center20,364
| 15–16
|- style="background:#fcc;"
| 32
| February 22
| @ Oklahoma City
| 
| Paul Pierce,Kevin Garnett (23)
| Kevin Garnett (13)
| Paul Pierce (8)
| Chesapeake Energy Arena18,203
| 15–17
|- style="text-align:center;"
| colspan="9" style="background:#bbcaff;"|All-Star Break
|- style="background:#cfc;"
| 33
| February 28
| @ Cleveland
| 
| Ray Allen (22)
| Chris Wilcox (11)
| Rajon Rondo (11)
| Quicken Loans Arena15,971
| 16–17
|- style="background:#cfc;"
| 34
| February 29
| Milwaukee
| 
| Kevin Garnett (25)
| Chris Wilcox (13)
| Rajon Rondo (10)
| TD Garden18,624
| 17–17

|- style="background:#cfc;"
| 35
| March 2
| New Jersey
| 
| Paul Pierce (27)
| Kevin Garnett (10)
| Rajon Rondo (13)
| TD Garden18,624
| 18–17
|- style="background:#cfc;"
| 36
| March 4
| New York
| 
| Paul Pierce (34)
| Rajon Rondo (17)
| Rajon Rondo (20)
| TD Garden18,624
| 19–17
|- style="background:#cfc;"
| 37
| March 6
| Houston
| 
| Paul Pierce (30)
| Kevin Garnett (13)
| Rajon Rondo (12)
| TD Garden18,624
| 20–17
|- style="background:#fcc;"
| 38
| March 7
| @ Philadelphia
| 
| Paul Pierce (16)
| Kevin Garnett, JaJuan Johnson (13)
| Rajon Rondo (8)
| Wells Fargo Center18,508
| 20–18
|- style="background:#cfc;"
| 39
| March 9
| Portland
| 
| Paul PierceRay Allen (22)
| Kevin Garnett (8)
| Rajon RondoAvery Bradley (5)
| TD Garden18,624
| 21–18
|- style="background:#fcc;"
| 40
| March 11
| @ L. A. Lakers
| 
| Rajon Rondo (24)
| Kevin Garnett (11)
| Rajon Rondo (10)
| Staples Center18,997
| 21–19
|- style="background:#cfc;"
| 41
| March 12
| @ L. A. Clippers
| 
| Paul Pierce (25)
| Brandon Bass (9)
| Rajon Rondo (10)
| Staples Center19,464
| 22–19
|- style="background:#cfc;"
| 42
| March 14
| @ Golden State
| 
| Kevin Garnett (24)
| Brandon Bass (9)
| Rajon Rondo (14)
| Oracle Arena19,596
| 23–19
|- style="background:#fcc;"
| 43
| March 16
| @ Sacramento
| 
| Ray Allen (26)
| Kevin Garnett (9)
| Rajon Rondo (12)
| Power Balance Pavilion17,317
| 23–20
|- style="background:#fcc;"
| 44
| March 17
| @ Denver
| 
| Paul PierceKevin Garnett (22)
| Kevin Garnett (9)
| Rajon Rondo (16)
| Pepsi Center19,003
| 23–21
|- style="background:#cfc;"
| 45
| March 19
| @ Atlanta
| 
| Ray Allen (19)
| Brandon Bass (10)
| Rajon Rondo (13)
| Philips Arena16,412
| 24–21
|- style="background:#cfc;"
| 46
| March 22
| @ Milwaukee
| 
| Paul Pierce (25)
| Brandon BassKevin Garnett (10)
| Rajon Rondo (14)
| Bradley Center15,171
| 25–21
|- style="background:#fcc;"
| 47
| March 23
| @ Philadelphia
| 
| Kevin GarnettPaul Pierce (20)
| Paul Pierce (9)
| Rajon Rondo (17)
| Wells Fargo Center19,583
| 25–22
|- style="background:#cfc;"
| 48
| March 25
| Washington
| 
| Avery Bradley (23)
| Paul Pierce (8)
| Rajon Rondo (11)
| TD Garden18,624
| 26–22
|- style="background:#cfc;"
| 49
| March 26
| @ Charlotte
| 
| Paul Pierce (36)
| Paul Pierce (10)
| Rajon Rondo (13)
| Time Warner Cable Arena16,357
| 27–22
|- style="background:#cfc;"
| 50
| March 28
| Utah
| 
| Kevin Garnett (23)
| Kevin Garnett (10)
| Rajon Rondo (14)
| TD Garden18,624
| 28–22
|- style="background:#cfc;"
| 51
| March 30
| @ Minnesota
| 
| Kevin Garnett (24)
| Kevin Garnett (10)
| Rajon Rondo (17)
| Target Center19356
| 29–22

|- style="background:#cfc;"
| 52
| April 1
| Miami
| 
| Paul Pierce (23)
| Rajon Rondo (11)
| Rajon Rondo (14)
| TD Garden18,624
| 30–22
|- style="background:#fcc;"
| 53
| April 4
| San Antonio
| 
| Avery Bradley (19)
| Paul Pierce (10)
| Rajon Rondo (11)
| TD Garden18,624
| 30–23
|- style="background:#fcc;"
| 54
| April 5
| @ Chicago
| 
| Paul Pierce (22)
| Kevin Garnett (14)
| Rajon Rondo (12)
| United Center22,423
| 30–24
|- style="background:#cfc;"
| 55
| April 7
| @ Indiana
| 
| Paul Pierce (24)
| Greg Stiemsma (9)
| Rajon Rondo (12)
| Bankers Life Fieldhouse16,892
| 31–24
|- style="background:#cfc;"
| 56
| April 8
| Philadelphia
| 
| Kevin Garnett (20)
| Brandon Bass, Kevin Garnett, Sasha Pavlovic (6)
| Rajon Rondo (15)
| TD Garden 18,624
| 32–24
|- style="background:#cfc;"
| 57
| April 10
| @ Miami
| 
| Paul Pierce (27)
| Brandon Bass (10)
| Rajon Rondo (15)
| American Airlines Arena  19,954
| 33–24
|- style="background:#cfc;"
| 58
| April 11
| Atlanta
| 
| Kevin Garnett (22)
| Kevin Garnett (12)
| Rajon Rondo (20)
| TD Garden 18,624
| 34–24
|- style="background:#fcc;"
| 59
| April 13
| @ Toronto
| 
| Paul Pierce (18)
| Kevin Garnett (10)
| Rajon Rondo (12)
| Air Canada Centre  17,270
| 34–25
|- style="background:#cfc;"
| 60
| April 14
| @ New Jersey
| 
| Kevin Garnett (21)
| Kevin Garnett (12)
| Rajon Rondo (15)
| Prudential Center18,711
| 35–25
|- style="background:#cfc;"
| 61
| April 15
| @ Charlotte
| 
| Brandon Bass, Avery Bradley (22)
| Brandon Bass (9)
| Rajon Rondo (16)
| Time Warner Cable Arena15,169
| 36–25
|- style="background:#fcc;"
| 62
| April 17
| @ New York
| 
| Paul Pierce (43)
| Brandon Bass, Rajon Rondo (6)
| Rajon Rondo (13)
| Madison Square Garden19,763
| 36–26
|- style="background:#cfc;"
| 63
| April 18
| Orlando
| 
| Paul Pierce (29)
| Kevin Garnett (9)
| Paul Pierce (14)
| TD Garden18,624
| 37–26
|- style="background:#fcc;"
| 64
| April 20
| @ Atlanta
| 
| Avery Bradley (28)
| Marquis Daniels (8)
| Sasha Pavlovic, Brandon Bass, Keyon Dooling, Avery Bradley, Marquis Daniels (3)
| Philips Arena
| 37–27
|- style="background:#cfc;"
| 65
| April 24
| Miami
| 
| Sasha Pavlovic (16)
| Brandon Bass (8)
| Marquis Daniels (4)
| TD Garden18,624
| 38–27
|- style="background:#cfc;"
| 66
| April 26
| Milwaukee
| 
| Avery Bradley (14)
| Brandon Bass (9)
| Rajon Rondo (15)
| TD Garden18,624
| 39–27

Playoffs

Game log

|- bgcolor=ffcccc
| 1
| April 29
| @ Atlanta
| 
| Kevin Garnett  Rajon Rondo (20)
| Kevin Garnett (12)
| Rajon Rondo (11)
| Philips Arena 19,292
| 0–1
|- bgcolor=bbffbb
| 2
| May 1
| @ Atlanta
| 
| Paul Pierce (36)
| Paul Pierce (14)
| Kevin Garnett (5)
| Philips Arena 19,292
| 1–1
|- bgcolor=bbffbb
| 3
| May 4
| Atlanta
| 
| Paul Pierce (21)
| Rajon Rondo (14)
| Rajon Rondo (12)
| TD Garden18,624
| 2–1
|- bgcolor=bbffbb
| 4
| May 6
| Atlanta
| 
| Paul Pierce (24)
| Kevin Garnett  Ray Allen  Brandon Bass (5)
| Rajon Rondo (16)
| TD Garden18,624
| 3–1
|- bgcolor=ffcccc
| 5
| May 8
| @ Atlanta
| 
| Paul Pierce (16)
| Kevin Garnett  Brandon Bass (7)
| Rajon Rondo (12)
| Philips Arena 19,292
| 3–2
|- bgcolor=bbffbb
| 6
| May 10
| Atlanta
| 
| Kevin Garnett (28)
| Kevin Garnett (14)
| Rajon Rondo (8)
| TD Garden18,624
| 4–2

|- bgcolor=bbffbb
| 1
| May 12
| Philadelphia
| 
| Kevin Garnett (24)
| Rajon Rondo (12)
| Rajon Rondo (17)
| TD Garden18,624
| 1–0
|- bgcolor=ffcccc
| 2
| May 14
| Philadelphia
| 
| Ray Allen (17)
| Kevin Garnett (12)
| Rajon Rondo (13)
| TD Garden18,624
| 1–1
|- bgcolor=bbffbb
| 3
| May 16
| @ Philadelphia
| 
| Kevin Garnett (27)
| Kevin Garnett (13)
| Rajon Rondo (14)
| Wells Fargo Center20,351
| 2–1
|- bgcolor=ffcccc
| 4
| May 18
| @ Philadelphia
| 
| Paul Pierce (24)
| Kevin Garnett (11)
| Rajon Rondo (15)
| Wells Fargo Center20,411
| 2–2
|- bgcolor=bbffbb
| 5
| May 21
| Philadelphia
| 
| Brandon Bass (27)
| Kevin GarnettBrandon Bass (6)
| Rajon Rondo (14)
| TD Garden18,624
| 3–2
|- bgcolor=ffcccc
| 6
| May 23
| @ Philadelphia
| 
| Paul Pierce (24)
| Kevin Garnett (11)
| Rajon Rondo (6)
| Wells Fargo Center20,403
| 3–3
|- bgcolor=bbffbb
| 7
| May 26
| Philadelphia
| 
| Kevin GarnettRajon Rondo (18)
| Kevin Garnett (13)
| Rajon Rondo (10)
| TD Garden18,624
| 4–3

|- bgcolor=ffcccc
| 1
| May 28
| @ Miami
| 
| Kevin Garnett (23)
| Kevin Garnett (10)
| Rajon Rondo (7)
| American Airlines Arena19,912
| 0–1
|- bgcolor=ffcccc
| 2
| May 30
| @ Miami
| 
| Rajon Rondo (44)
| Brandon Bass (10)
| Rajon Rondo (10)
| American Airlines Arena19,973
| 0–2
|- bgcolor=bbffbb
| 3
| June 1
| Miami
| 
| Kevin Garnett (24)
| Kevin Garnett (11)
| Rajon Rondo (10)
| TD Garden18,624
| 1–2
|- bgcolor=bbffbb
| 4
| June 3
| Miami
| 
| Paul Pierce (23)
| Kevin Garnett (14)
| Rajon Rondo (15)
| TD Garden18,624
| 2–2
|- bgcolor=bbffbb
| 5
| June 5
| @ Miami
| 
| Kevin Garnett (26)
| Kevin Garnett (11)
|  Rajon Rondo (13)
| American Airlines Arena20,021
| 3–2
|- bgcolor=ffcccc
| 6
| June 7
| Miami
| 
| Rajon Rondo (21)
| Brandon Bass (7)
|  Rajon Rondo (10)
| TD Garden18,624
| 3–3
|- bgcolor=ffcccc
| 7
| June 9
| @ Miami
| 
| Rajon Rondo (22)
| Rajon Rondo (10)
| Rajon Rondo (14)
| American Airlines Arena20,114
| 3–4

Player statistics

Season

|-style="text-align:center"
| 
|46 || 42 || 34.0 || .458 ||style="background:#efe196;color:#008040;"| .453 || .915 || 3.1 || 2.4 || 1.1 || .2 || 14.2
|-style="text-align:center"
| 
|59 || 39 || 31.7 || .479 ||  || .810 || 6.2 || .9 || .6 || .9 || 12.5
|-style="text-align:center"
| 
|style="background:#efe196;color:#008040;"|64 || 28 || 21.4 || .498 || .407 || .795 || 1.8 || 1.4 || .7 || .2 || 7.6
|-style="text-align:center"
| 
|38 || 0 || 12.7 || .364 || .000 || .739 || 1.7 || 1.2 || .6 || .2 || 3.2
|-style="text-align:center"
| 
|46 || 2 || 14.4 || .405 || .333 || .742 || 0.8 || 1.1 || .3 || .0 || 4.0
|-style="text-align:center"
| 
|60 || 60 || 31.1 || .503 || .333 || .857 ||style="background:#efe196;color:#008040;"| 8.2 || 2.9 || .9 || 1.0 || 15.8
|-style="text-align:center"
| 
|15 || 1 || 10.7 ||style="background:#efe196;color:#008040;"| .643 ||  || .300 || 1.7 || .2 || .1 || .3 || 2.8
|-style="text-align:center"
| 
|36 || 0 || 8.3 || .446 ||  || .667 || 1.6 || .2 || .1 || .4 || 3.2
|-style="text-align:center"
| 
|38 || 0 || 8.7 || .381 || .378 ||style="background:#efe196;color:#008040;"| 1.000 || .9 || .9 || .3 || .1 || 2.9
|-style="text-align:center"
| 
|25 || 24 || 22.8 || .433 ||  || .677 || 5.4 || .4 || .3 ||style="background:#efe196;color:#008040;"| 1.7 || 5.0
|-style="text-align:center"
| 
|45 || 7 || 11.7 || .391 || .293 || .375 || 1.6 || .4 || .4 || .3 || 2.7
|-style="text-align:center"
| 
|61 ||style="background:#efe196;color:#008040;"|61 || 34.0 || .443 || .366 || .852 || 5.2 || 4.5 || 1.1 || .4 ||style="background:#efe196;color:#008040;"| 19.4
|-style="text-align:center"
| 
|42 || 6 || 21.9 || .385 || .335 || .645 || 3.1 || .6 || .5 || .2 || 6.9
|-style="text-align:center"
| 
| 53 || 53 ||style="background:#efe196;color:#008040;"| 36.9 || .448 || .238 || .597 || 4.8 ||style="background:#efe196;color:#008040;"| 11.7 ||style="background:#efe196;color:#008040;"| 1.8 || .1 || 11.9
|-style="text-align:center"
| 
|55 || 3 || 13.9 || .545 ||  || .707 || 3.2 || .5 || .7 || 1.5 || 2.9
|-style="text-align:center"
| 
|28 || 4 || 17.2 || .598 ||  || .615 || 4.4 || .4 || .4 || .3 || 5.4
|-style="text-align:center"
| 
|3 || 0 || 14.0 || .333 ||  ||style="background:#efe196;color:#008040;"| 1.000 || 4.0 || 1.0 || 1.0 || 1.0 || 3.7
|}

 Statistics with the Boston Celtics.

Awards, records and milestones
 Paul Pierce was named Eastern Conference Player of the Week twice (January 30 – February 5 and March 26 – April 1).
 Kevin Garnett was named Eastern Conference Player of the Week (April 9 – 15).
 Paul Pierce and Rajon Rondo participated in the 2012 NBA All-Star Game. It was their 10th and 3rd appearance respectively.
On March 22 Paul Pierce surpassed Clyde Drexler on the All-time scoring leaders table in a 100–91 win against the Milwaukee Bucks.

Injuries and suspensions
 Jeff Green was not available for the 2011–12 season due to recovery from a heart surgery.
Chris Wilcox was out for the season in March with a cardiac irregularity.
 Jermaine O'Neal was out for the season on March to have surgery on his left wrist.
 Rajon Rondo earned a two-game suspension for throwing the ball to a referee during a game against the Detroit Pistons on February 19 and was suspended for one game during the playoffs for bumping a referee on game 1 of the first round against the Atlanta Hawks.

Transactions

Overview

Trades

Free agents

Many players signed with teams from other leagues due to the 2011 NBA lockout. FIBA allows players under NBA contracts to sign and play for teams from other leagues if the contracts have opt-out clauses that allow the players to return to the NBA if the lockout ends. The Chinese Basketball Association, however, only allows its clubs to sign foreign free agents who could play for at least the entire season.

See also
 2011–12 NBA season

References

Boston Celtics seasons
Boston Celtics
Boston Celtics
Boston Celtics
Celtics
Celtics